Shin Dong-woo (born June 16, 1991), better known by his stage name CNU, is a South Korean singer and actor. He is best known for being a member of the South Korean boy group B1A4. In 2012, he appeared in the KBS sitcom Sent from Heaven.

Early life
Shin Dong-woo was born on June 16, 1991, in Cheongju, North Chungcheong, South Korea. He studied at Bongmyung High School. In his adolescence, he formed a rock band with his friend Jooyoung. He later studied at Hanyang University in the Department of Theater and Film.

Career
CNU was revealed as a member of idol quintet B1A4 on April 15, 2011, where he served as a vocalist and rapper. The group debuted six days later with their debut mini album Let's Fly and lead single "OK". Since then, CNU has participated in B1A4's four studio albums and six EPs.

In May 2022, CNU's agency confirmed that CNU's solo fan meeting '2022 B1A4 BANA - HAPPY CNU DAY' will be held on June 12, 2022.

Discography

Soundtrack appearances

Production and songwriting credits

Filmography

Television series

Music Videos

Musical theater

References

1991 births
B1A4 members
Japanese-language singers
Living people
People from Cheongju
South Korean male idols
South Korean male pop singers
South Korean male television actors
WM Entertainment artists